Growing Up Supermodel is a docuseries  on Lifetime. The series premiered on August 16, 2017, and follows the nascent careers of daughters and sons of famous models or actors. The premise of the show was greenlit because many of the current top models of the fashion industry are children of famous people with large social media followings.

Cast
 Kelly Le Brock - American-British fashion model and actress.
 Arissa Le Brock - Plus size model and daughter of Kelly and American actor Steven Seagal.
 Andrea Schroder - Ex-wife of American actor Ricky Schroder.
 Cambrie Schroder - Model and oldest daughter of Andrea and Ricky Schroder.
 Faith Schroder - Model and younger daughter of Andrea and Ricky Schroder.
 Beverly Peele - American fashion model
 Cairo Peele - Model and daughter of Beverly Peele.
 Shanna Moakler - American model, Miss USA 1995, Playboy Playmate, actress, and reality television personality.
 Atiana De La Hoya - Model and daughter of Shanna Moakler and American former boxer Oscar De La Hoya. Former stepdaughter of American rock musician Travis Barker.
 Krista Allen - American actress
 Jake Morritt - American male model, actor and son of Krista Allen.
 J.D. Ostojic - Belgian male model
 Janis Ostojic - Belgian male model and son of J.D. Ostojic.

Episodes

References 

Lifetime (TV network) original programming
2010s American reality television series